Yevgeniya Ivanovna Davidyuk (born March 22, 1981), known professionally as , is a Russian voice actress, singer, and radio personality based in Japan.

Early life
Yevgeniya Davidyuk was born at Novosibirsk, Soviet Union on March 22, 1981, and spent most of her childhood at Gorky. Her father was a military officer who taught his subordinates the ideologies of the communist party. She has a younger brother. At the age of eight, her family moved to Czechoslovakia for a five-year stay due to her father's work, but they returned to the Soviet Union a year later and lived in Kaliningrad for almost two years before moving back to Novosibirsk. At the age of 16, she became interested in voice acting after watching the Japanese animated series Sailor Moon in 1997, which she described as the "anime that changed my life". She majored in information technology at Novosibirsk State University of Economics and Management in 1998. While studying, she frequently visited the Siberia-Hokkaido Cultural Center where she founded an anime club and learned Japanese. She moved to Japan in 2005, where she worked part-time in Akihabara.

Career
Jenya created an anime fan website (kawaii.otaku.ru) in 2000, where she posted anime songs she performed in Japanese. She became known as "the Russian anime singer who sings in Japanese" in 2002 and was invited by the Japanese broadcast channel Mondo2 (now Mondo TV) to appear on a show. She arrived in Tokyo for the first time with her father for a week to be filmed. In 2007, she was hired as a Russian language coach for anime productions, including Black Lagoon. She made her voice acting debut as an operator at NERV's Bethany Base in the 2009 anime film Evangelion: 2.0 You Can (Not) Advance.

In 2013, Jenya was a finalist for CanCams model audition. In 2014, she returned to Russia to host and sing in a Game Symphony Japan concert, where an orchestra performs music from games and anime, after an invitation from conductor Kenichi Shimura. She performed again with the orchestra in Tokyo in July 2016, in Russia in April 2018, and in Yokohama in November.

In 2015, she was announced as the voice of Klara, an original character specifically created by director Tsutomu Mizushima for her, in Girls und Panzer der Film. She met Mizushima after the production team found her tweet stating her lack of role in Girls und Panzer despite the appearance of Russian-based characters in the series.

Jenya is currently a freelance. She previously worked under  (September 2008–September 2010), 81 Produce (November 2010–May 2014), K Hive (March 2015–2018),  (July 2018–October 2020), and New Gate Tokyo (January 2021–July 2022).

Personal life
Jenya passed the N1 Japanese-Language Proficiency Test and scored 935 points on the TOEIC. In 2016, Jenya announced on her blog that she had married and was pregnant. On March 20, 2017, she gave birth to a girl.

Filmography

Television

Anime films

Video games

Dubbing
Transformers: Dark of the Moon, Russian lady (Inna Korobkina)
X-Men: First Class, Teenage girl (Sasha Pieterse)

References

External links
 Official blog 
 Official agency profile 
 
 

1981 births
Living people
Actors from Novosibirsk
Novosibirsk State University of Economics and Management alumni
Japanese women singers
Japanese television personalities
Japanese video game actresses
Japanese voice actresses
Russian expatriates in Japan
Russian voice actresses